Petrópolis Environmental Protection Area is a protected area of Rio de Janeiro state, Brazil.

Location

It is administered by the Chico Mendes Institute for Biodiversity Conservation.
It includes the Serra dos Órgãos National Park.
It contains all or part of the municipalities of Petrópolis, Magé, Guapimirim and Duque de Caxias in Rio de Janeiro state.

Environment

Rainfall averages  annually.
The area lies in the orogenic belt of the state of Rio de Janeiro, in the Mantiqueira geological province of the Brazilian platform.
Streams and rivers typically have rocky beds and slope steeply, running rapidly after rainfall.
The rivers originating in the protection area flow south into Guanabara Bay or north to the Paraíba do Sul.
The vegetation is classified as Tropical Rain Forest or Atlantic Forest, but varies greatly due to differences in altitude and the orientation of the slopes. 
Most of the species are evergreen, since dry periods are short or non-existent in the region.

Conservation

The environment protection area is classed as IUCN protected area category V, protected landscape/seascape.
The purpose is to ensure the preservation of the Atlantic Forest ecosystem and the sustainable use of natural resources while conserving the cultural landscape and improving the quality of human life in the region.
The conservation unit is in the Central Rio de Janeiro Atlantic Forest Mosaic, created in 2006.
Problems include the expansion of urban areas, which has led to poorly planned clearance of slopes causing the risk of landslides, deforestation, and inappropriate agricultural practices including cattle grazing and pasture burning that contribute to soil degradation.

Notes

Sources

Environmental protection areas of Brazil
Protected areas of Rio de Janeiro (state)